Ashbrook High School is a  public high school in the Gaston County Schools public school district located in Gastonia, North Carolina. The school was the result of the merger of two former senior high schools, Holbrook Senior High and Ashley Senior High. The first class graduated in 1971. Its attendance range covers most of the central and eastern portions of the City of Gastonia, as well as the towns of Ranlo and Lowell, and the community of Springdale.

Athletics
Ashbrook High School last won the North Carolina State Football Championship in 2002 as well as the Baseball State Championship in 2003. In 2015, the Ashbrook men's basketball team made it to the 3A state championship basketball game.

Notable alumni
 Darrell Armstrong – former NBA player, assistant coach for the Dallas Mavericks
 Wes Helms – former MLB player and current manager of the Charlotte Knights
 Patrick McHenry – U.S. representative for North Carolina's 10th congressional district
 Michal Smolen – Polish-American Olympic slalom canoeist
 James Worthy – American sports commentator, television host, analyst, and former NBA player
 Jeb Stuart (writer)  – American screenwriter and producer of films like Die Hard and The Fugitive

References

External links
 Official School Homepage

Public high schools in North Carolina
Schools in Gaston County, North Carolina
Gastonia, North Carolina